= Cottin SAS =

Cottin SAS is a family held business based in Paris, France. It specializes in the creation of high end luxury goods for technology items, such as "luxury computers", iPad and iPhone decorations and baggage. It's located in Paris, as well as in boutiques and the internet. The products revolve around providing technological devices with a more humanistic touch.

== History ==
Cottin was established in 2009 by Francois Cottin, when he left his former post at Boston Consulting Group and took a loan from family and friends, to start a company which catered to what he identified as a gap in the luxury technology market. Francois collaborated with a Spanish architect to design the concept of the 413 "luxury computer". Cottin worked on product development for the first two years, and it went on sale in 2011. Cottin then entered into distributorship agreements in Russia and Monaco, while at the same time operating offices in Dubai and Hong Kong.

In March 2015, Cottin went bankrupt.

== Products ==
=== Luxury computer ===
The core product of Cottin is their luxury computer. Cottin utilizes engineers, artists and craftsmen. Each device requires the input of over forty experts and requires over a hundred hours to complete. Cottin provides customization services and provide their clients with a number of different materials such as different metals, exotic leathers and jewellery in order to make a personalized device. Everything from concept, designing to manufacture and production is done by hand in the workshops in Paris as each device is customized according to the clients needs.

=== USB keys ===
Cottin produces their own USB keys which consist of elements such as Rosewood, Gold, Titanium and Platinum.

=== iPad decorations ===
Cottin decorates iPad and iPad minis. This includes plating the shell in different metallizations such as gold or silver, as well as decorating iPad covers by sheathing them in exotic leather. Additional services in the form of engraving and gilding are utilized to customize the devices further.

=== iPhone decorations ===
In 2013, Cottin added Apple iPhone decorations. Like the iPad, each iPhone can be decorated from a choice of materials such as metallizations and exotic leather.

=== Baggage ===
Cottin creates baggage for various products such as handbags for computers and sleeves for the iPad and iPhone. Like the other devices, these are custom made.
